Stephanie Yeager is an American politician and a former member of the Kansas House of Representatives, representing the 96th district. She was selected by Democratic Party precinct committee members in Sedgwick County on December 4, 2019, to succeed Democrat Brandon Whipple, who resigned on January 13, 2020, to be sworn-in as mayor of Wichita. Yeager was sworn in as a state representative on January 14, following a formal appointment by Governor Laura Kelly.

2019–2020 Kansas House of Representatives Committee assignments
Education 
Elections

References

Living people
Democratic Party members of the Kansas House of Representatives
Politicians from Wichita, Kansas
21st-century American politicians
21st-century American women politicians
Women state legislators in Kansas
Year of birth missing (living people)